The 6th Guards Motor Rifle Vitebsk-Novgorod Twice Red Banner Division (Military Unit Number 68434) was a Soviet motor rifle division, which after the end of World War II was stationed on the Polish territory as part of Northern Group of Forces. It was the second formation of the 6th Guards Motor Rifle Division, and drew its history from the 90th Guards Rifle Division.

History 

In an exchange of numbers, the 6th Guards Lvov Motor Rifle Division (First Formation) in Germany in 1985 became the 90th Guards Tank Division, while the 90th Guards Tank Division became the 6th Guards Motor Rifle Division. The division in Poland disbanded a tank regiment and formed a motor rifle regiment, while the division in Germany formed a tank regiment.

Division headquarters was located in the town of Borne Sulinowo.

In November 1985, the 65th Separate Air Assault Battalion was formed from the division's 126th Separate Guards Reconnaissance Battalion in Białogard. Between May and November 1986, the battalion was expanded to form the 83rd Separate Air Assault Brigade under the command of Colonel V.M. Sinitsyn.

The Division withdrew from Poland in 1992 and was moved to Tver in the Moscow Military District where it became the 166th Guards Motor Rifle Brigade. Between January and July 1996 it fought in the First Chechen War. In 1997 the brigade was disbanded and converted into the 70th Guards Base for Storage of Weapons & Equipment. The 70th VkhVT was finally disbanded in 1998.

The lineage of the division is perpetuated by the 90th Guards Tank Division, reformed in 2016.

Composition

1985 
The division was composed of the following units.
16th Guards Motor Rifle Regiment
82nd Guards Motor Rifle Regiment – Sypniewo
252nd Motor Rifle Regiment
80th Tank Regiment 
193rd Guards Self-Propelled Artillery Regiment
1082nd Anti-Aircraft Missile Regiment
90th Tank Battalion
54th Guards Communications Battalion
465th Anti-Tank Artillery Battalion
101st Guards Engineer-Sapper Battalion
126th Reconnaissance Battalion
71st Equipment Maintenance and Recovery Battalion
1083rd Material Supply Battalion
97th Medical Battalion
669th Missile Battalion

Commanders 
Major General Vladimir Vasilyevich Bulgakov (1990–1992)

Notes

References 
Andrew Wojtaszak, Kazimierz Kozlowski: Soldier Polish Western Pomerania X-XX century: the materials of scientific session of 10 November 1999: collective work. Wilson: Department of Civic Education, 2001.  .

006
Military units and formations established in 1985
Military units and formations disestablished in 1992
Military units and formations awarded the Order of the Red Banner
1985 establishments in the Soviet Union